The 1976 WTA Westchester Invitational was a women's tennis tournament that took place on clay courtss at the Westchester Country Club in Harrison, Westchester County, New York in the United States. It was part of the 1976 WTA Tour and was held from on August 24 through August 29, 1976. The tournament was organized on short notice by the WTA after 25 players withdrew from the Tennis Week Open after transgender player Renée Richards received a wildcard. Fifth-seeded Beth Norton won the singles title and earned $1,800 first-prize money.

Finals

Singles
 Beth Norton defeated  Ruta Gerulaitis 1–6, 7–5, 6–3

Doubles
 Patricia Bostrom /  Janice Metcalf defeated  Laura DuPont /  Valerie Ziegenfuss 6–2, 6–3

References

WTA Westchester Invitational
WTA Westchester Invitational
WTA Westchester Invitational
Tennis tournaments in New York (state)